was the Minister of Internal Affairs and Communications of Japan from September 2010 through September 2011. He was the governor of Tottori Prefecture from 1999 to 2007.

References 

1951 births
Democratic Party of Japan politicians
Government ministers of Japan
Living people
Ministers of Internal Affairs of Japan
People from Okayama
Governors of Tottori Prefecture